The European Association for Artificial Intelligence (EurAI) (formerly European Co-ordinating Committee for Artificial Intelligence (ECCAI)) is the representative body for the European artificial intelligence community. 

EurAI was established in 1982. Founding president of EurAI was Wolfgang Bibel. The aim of EurAI is to promote the study, research and application of artificial intelligence (AI) in Europe.

Activities
Every even-numbered year, EurAI, jointly with one of the member associations of EurAI, holds the European Conference on Artificial Intelligence (ECAI). The conference has become the leading conference for this field in Europe.

The Artificial Intelligence Dissertation Award sponsored by EurAI has been awarded since 1998.

Fellowship

According to the association, EurAI Fellows program was created in order to "recognise individuals who have made significant, sustained contributions to the field of artificial intelligence (AI) in Europe." It has been in operation since 1999.

References

External links
Official Website
Business AI Platform
Member Societies Of The EuAI

Artificial intelligence associations
Pan-European learned societies
1982 establishments in Europe
Organizations established in 1982